Kamayut Township (also spelt Kamaryut Township) is located in the north central part of Yangon. The township comprises ten wards, and shares borders with Hlaing township in the north, Hlaing township and Kyimyindaing township in the west, the Inya Lake, Bahan township and Mayangon township in the east, and Sanchaung township in the south.

One of the most prosperous areas in Yangon (a prime upmarket area), Kamayut is also the "college town" of the Yangon. Pyay Road which cuts across the township is lined with many education and media related institutions such as Myanmar Radio and Television headquarters. Yangon University, the University of Medicine 1, Yangon, the Yangon Institute of Economics, the Yangon Institute of Education and affiliated TTC and University of Distance Education, Yangon are all located in the township. The township has twelve primary schools, two middle schools and five high schools.

Etymology
"Kamayut" derives from the Mon language term "Kamarot", which means "lake of gems".

Landmarks
The following is a list of landmarks protected by the city in Kamayut township.

Economy
Sinhmalike Market, formerly Kunchan Market, built in 1962, is the township's primary market. In 2010, the Yangon administration announced it would upgrade the market by building an eight-storey  shopping center.

Kamayut Township is also home to Junction Square Centre, a 4-storey  shopping centre on the corner of Pyay and Kyuntaw Roads and opened in March 2012. The Blazon Department Store is also located in the township.

The M&A Office Tower, a 17-storey office building, is expected to be completed in 2013.

References

Townships of Yangon